German National District is an administrative and municipal district (raion), one of the fifty-nine in Altai Krai, Russia. It is located in the northwest of the krai. Its administrative center is the rural locality (a selo) of Galbshtadt. Population:   The population of Galbshtadt accounts for 9.9% of the district's total population.

History
The official name of that area is "Deutscher Nationalkreis im Altai-Gebiet" (German national rayon in the Altai District). The district was established on July 4, 1927 and abolished on November 5, 1938 by Stalin. On July 4, 1991 it was resurrected by special orders of President Boris Yeltsin. Bonn and Moscow also agreed to the foundation of another German rayon: Asowo in the district of Omsk. Halbstadt, however, had already existed as a German village between 1927 and 1938, before Stalin put an end to it.

Economy 
After the fall of the Soviet Union, Germany actively aided the development of the economy and social services in the district.

Transportation
The "Pavlodar - Tomsk" highway (including the "Slavgorod - Kamen-na-Obi" section) runs through the district.

References

Notes

Sources



Districts of Altai Krai
States and territories established in 1927
States and territories disestablished in 1938
States and territories established in 1991
German communities in Russia